Old Main Line may refer to:

BCN Old Main Line, a canal network (and historic company name) in Birmingham, England
BMT Lexington Avenue Line, he first standard elevated railway in Brooklyn, New York
Old Main Line Subdivision of CSX Transportation (and formerly of the Baltimore and Ohio Railroad)